"Three Little Words" may refer to:
 
"Three Little Words" (song), a 1930 song by Bert Kalmar and Harry Ruby
Three Little Words (film), a 1950 movie about Kalmar and Ruby
Three Little Words (TV series), a British TV game show of the 1970s
"Three Little Words", a 1996 song by Billy Ray Cyrus
"Three Little Words", a 2000 song by Da Vinci's Notebook